Mrs. Dash is an American brand of salt-free seasoning that was introduced in 1983 and was marketed by B&G Foods. The best known varieties of Mrs. Dash are granulated mixtures of dried herbs and spices which are sold in small plastic shaker bottles holding 2.5 oz of product, 1.25 oz packets, for seasoning a 'family-size' meal, and .02 oz single-serving packets for consumers and institutional use, e.g. for patients on sodium-restricted diets.

The product line was originally developed by Carol Bernick, now executive chairperson of the company. In the 1980s, while a marketing executive at the firm, she was frustrated with the products available to flavor the meals she prepared at home for her family. She invented a salt-free blend of her own to fill the need for a convenient way to flavor the food without using salt. The original formula, which was first marketed in 1981, was developed with a variety of spice suppliers. Before settling on the name "Mrs. Dash," the company considered the name "Mrs. Pinch."

The brand was formerly owned by Alberto-Culver; following the merger with Unilever, it sold its food business to B&G Foods.

In 1990, Mrs. Dash used the tagline "I Love Mrs. Dash". In 1993, it adopted the tagline "A Garden of Flavor, Instead of Salt", and in 1994, the tagline "Do it Better with Mrs. Dash" was used. 

In early 2020, the product was rebranded as "Dash", dropping the "Mrs." from its name.

Seasoning blends
The company produces seasoning blends in thirteen varieties:
 Original
 Extra Spicy
 Lemon Pepper
 Southwest Chipotle
 Tomato Basil Garlic
 Garlic & Herb
 Italian Medley
 Onion & Herb Blend
 Table [in 2.5 oz and 6.75 oz bottles]
 Fiesta Lime
 Caribbean Citrus
 Everything But the Salt
 Spicy Jalapeño 

It also produces grilling blends in two flavors: 
 Steak Grilling Blend 
 Chicken Grilling Blend

Marinades
The company produces three flavors of 10-minute liquid marinades sold in 12 oz plastic bottles:
Garlic Herb 
Lime Garlic 
Sweet Teriyaki Marinade

References

External links
Mrs. Dash official site

Herb and spice mixtures
Brand name condiments
Products introduced in 1981